= Gongguan Tuff =

The Gongguan Tuff is a stratum distributed in the northern part of Taiwan. In 1930, Yuichi Ichikawa named it the Gongguan Tuff. It is a product of volcanic eruptions on the seafloor during the Miocene, 20 to 23 million years ago. The thickness of the public tuff varies greatly from a few meters to 200 meters or thicker.

There are displays on the trail next to the Zun-yin Hall of NTU and the Land Temple of National Taiwan University, which was originally a mound composed of the Gongguan Tuff.

== Distribution ==
The public house tuffs are mainly distributed in northern Taiwan, from Keelung and Wanli in the north to Dahan Creek and Jiao Ban Mountain in Taoyuan City in the south. It is not found south of the Zhutoujiao River stage of the Dahan River at the junction of Taoyuan and Hsinchu, so Zhutoujiao is regarded as the southernmost boundary of the Gongguan Tuff.

There are four best areas where the Public House Tuff is exposed

- The area around Keelung Neihu
- Nangang Shenkeng area (from Gongguan to Liuzhangli)
- The area around Yingge Forest (Shanzifu)
- The area around Zhonghe Tucheng (Qingshui Keng)
